Michael Gillette may refer to:

 W. Michael Gillette (born 1941), American attorney and retired judge
 Michael L. Gillette (born 1945), American author and historian
 Mike Gillette, American football and baseball player

See also
 Michael Gillett, rugby league player
 Michael Cavenagh Gillett, British diplomat
 Mic Gillette, American brass player